Tommy Campbell (born 6 October 1978) is an actor, stand-up comedian and writer. He is a dual-citizen of Ireland and Canada.

Career

Comedy 
Campbell regularly serves as the opener for comedian Jim Jefferies during his Canadian tours.

In 2016, Campbell released Hamster Pimp, a stand-up comedy album that charted in the top twenty-five on iTunes and aired on Sirius XM. In 2017, he released "Stupid Shaming", which also airs on Sirius XM. Tommy Campbell has been featured on stand-up comedy shows in England, Ireland, Austria, Mumbai, Scotland, Wales, France, Bahrain, Qatar, United Arab Emirates, Spain, Greece, Croatia, Singapore, Cyprus, Japan, Hong Kong, the Philippines, the United States and Canada. He spent ten years based in London, England where he was a regular at The Comedy Store, London, The 99 Club, The Comedy Cafe, Jongleurs, Headliners, Highlight, Lee Hurst's Backyard Comedy Club, Big Night Out Comedy Clubs, The Funny Side Comedy Clubs and many others.

In 2004 and 2005, Campbell was nominated for a Canadian Comedy Award.

Writing 
Campbell is a member of the Writers' Guild of Great Britain. He wrote and starred in the SXSW award-winning 'Clone' commercial for Walmart and his screenplay "The Vile" was a "winner" at the 2011 Nevada Film Festival. He is an original member of the Funny or Die Community where he contributes videos as a writer/director. His videos "Deuce Bag", "Undercover Boss – Pimp", and "Saxophone Hero" have been featured on the front page of Funny or Die. His latest short film, Secret Agent Problems, had multiple screenings around the world including the Calgary International Film Festival, London International Film Festival, Just for Laughs, Cinevic, Singapore Film Festival and the Muskoka International Film Festival.

Campbell regularly contributes to the Huff Post.

Campbell has also published a comedy book, The Slacker Confessions, in 2003.

Works

Films

Television

Video games

Discography

References

External links
 
Tommy Campbell on Twitter
 Tommy Campbell's Official Site

1978 births
Living people
Canadian male comedians
Canadian people of Irish descent
Canadian male television actors
Irish male comedians
Canadian male voice actors